Vehicle impoundment is the legal process of placing a vehicle into an impoundment lot or tow yard, which is a holding place for cars until they are placed back in the control of the owner, recycled for their metal, stripped of their parts at a wrecking yard or auctioned off for the benefit of the impounding agency. The impounding agency can be a police department while all terms are negotiated between politicians and towing companies.

Reasons for impoundment
Vehicles may be impounded: 
 by government agencies (usually municipalities) when 
 there are unresolved parking violation(s) of a certain age and possibly above a total fine threshold 
 in certain instances, during the violation of a parking ordinance (in zones marked "tow away zone" or similar) 
 the registrant of the vehicle has certain unresolved moving violations
 the vehicle is collected as evidence of the commission of a potential crime (e.g. homicide or drug smuggling).
 there are no qualified drivers to operate the vehicle
 in some jurisdictions, as part of repossession of a vehicle by a lessor or lender

The process for impoundment is as follows: 
 Owner or operator creates the legal basis for impoundment as above (failure to make payments, illegal vehicle usage, etc.) 
 A grant of authority to impound is made either implicitly or explicitly (see below) 
 An agency that has the legal authority to execute impoundment locates the vehicle (see below) 
 The agency takes possession of the vehicle and tows it to the impoundment lot 
 If the owner or operator does not clear the issue (payment, etc.), after a certain defined period, the vehicle is sold at auction 
 After deducting the costs of the auction, the impoundment process and any other fees from the sale price, the remainder is returned to the owner

Grant of authority
Before a vehicle can be impounded, the impounding agency must receive some right to perform impoundment. In some cases, this may involve a court decision. In others, there is an automatic right to impound if certain conditions are met. For example, in New York City, a parking ticket that is not pleaded for 100 days, or not paid 100 days after losing a court decision, results in default judgement, and a car with a ticket in default judgement may automatically be eligible for the New York City Sheriff to impound.

For repossession-based impoundment, the lending agency or its assignee is granted authority by either a court order, or in some cases, by contract law. In some jurisdictions, that authority may allow the lender to repossess the vehicle using its own resources; in others, the lender must request a sheriff, marshall, or other government agent to perform or oversee the repossession activity.

Locating the vehicle
The impounding agency may identify an impoundment candidate and hunt for it. This is often true in cases of repossession, very large outstanding fines, or serious vehicle violations. More typically, an impounding agency has a list of vehicles to impound, and sends agents to check every car in a certain area against that list. If the agent happens to locate a vehicle on the list, the agent starts the process of taking possession and towing of the vehicle

Towing the vehicle
The impounding agent may travel in a tow truck, in which case, he may be able to conduct the tow directly with no additional input. Often, the agent may not have the authority to do so, and may have to call in a specific resource (badged agent, marshall, etc.) to oversee the operation. If the locating agent or the authorized agent does not have a tow vehicle, they will have to call one in, either from the agency's own fleet or from a contracted towing company.

In some cases, if the owner or operator intervenes during the tow procedure, he may be able to stop it, often by paying the fine on the spot via a portable credit card reader.

The towed vehicle is taken to an impoundment lot. The lot may be exclusively for impoundments, or it may be a storage yard that also serves other functions, such as parking for an area site, or a vehicle repair shop.

Auction
An impounded vehicle auction is a type of auction that specializes in selling abandoned and disabled vehicles.  Once a car is towed by municipalities or private companies and the requisite time has passed, the cars are auctioned to recover the cost of towing and storage.

These auctions are typically held by an auctioneer on the grounds of the tow lot, but Internet-based auctions are becoming more common.

Most states require a rigorous process to determine the owner of the vehicle and the disposition of the title before allowing a vehicle to be auctioned.  This includes a title search, publication of an impending sale and certified letters in an attempt to give the vehicle's owner an opportunity to pay towing and storage costs and recover the vehicle.  In the case of serviceable vehicles, the towing company may offer this documentation in a packet known as the possessory lien papers, which can be used to obtain a new title.  Given the expense of the process, many lots will charge a significant fee for the papers.

States and municipalities vary widely in their treatment of impound auctions. In some states, bidders must register as salvage dealers or restoration companies in order to bid. In Missouri, impounded vehicles may only be offered to the general public with a salvage title, while other states have no restrictions on who may purchase a vehicle.

Impounded vehicles are offered as-is, where-is with no warranty. Those auctioning the vehicles likely have no knowledge of its mechanical condition beyond the obvious (such as rust), and are generally exempt from providing warranties.  As a winning bidder, one must purchase and take possession of the vehicle, even if it is not capable of leaving the lot under its own power. Keys are not always available, and in cars with a digital dash, the mileage may not be known.

Origin
The word impound means to place into a pound, a secured area to hold things. An impoundment lot can thus be simply called a "pound", but the use of "impoundment lot" in current usage typically means a vehicle impoundment lot, as opposed to, say,  a dog pound. An equivalent unambiguous phrasing is "vehicle pound", which is still a term in current widespread use.

Local laws

Australia

Queensland
In April 2013, the Queensland Government approved amendments to the Police Powers and Responsibilities Act 2000, regarding motor vehicle impoundment with the aim of improving road safety.

On November 1, 2013, State of Queensland the amended legislation commenced as the country's toughest anti-hooning laws.

From May 1, 2014, Australian towing company Tow.com.au was contracted by the Queensland Police Service as the exclusive provider of towing & impoundment relating to hoon type 1 & type 2 offences in State of Queensland.

Canada

Ontario 
Vehicle impoundment is an option, or is mandatory, for a variety of offences, among them exceeding a posted speed limit by at least 50 km/h and drunk-driving.

United States

California
In 2015, Sacramento attempted to pass legislation in consideration of Homeless persons in high risk impoundment situations. The law could prevent a common practice of salvaging a homeless persons sleeping quarters for a profit of $50 which would be paid to the impound lot.

Washington
In Seattle, impound fees in (3) separate towing classes range between $165-$209 per hour.

See also
Tow truck
 Impoundment
Towing racket

References

Governmental auctions